WXRS may refer to:

 WXRS (AM), a radio station (1590 AM) licensed to Swainsboro, Georgia, United States
 WXRS-FM, a radio station (100.5 FM) licensed to Swainsboro, Georgia, United States